Madagascar competed at the 2008 Summer Paralympics in Beijing, China.

Swimming

See also
Madagascar at the Paralympics
Madagascar at the 2008 Summer Olympics

References

External links
Beijing 2008 Paralympic Games Official Site
International Paralympic Committee

Nations at the 2008 Summer Paralympics
2008
Paralympics